Jitendra Motibhai Patel (born 26 November 1945) is a Ugandan-born former cricketer who played for the for Canadian cricket team. He played three One Day Internationals in the 1979 World Cup, as well as appearing for the country in the 1979 ICC Trophy tournament.

References

External links

1945 births
Living people
Canada One Day International cricketers
Canadian cricketers
Canadian Hindus
Canadian people of Gujarati descent
Gujarati people
Ugandan emigrants to Canada
Ugandan people of Indian descent
Ugandan cricketers
Canadian people of Indian descent